The 2008 Next Generation Adelaide International was a men's tennis tournament played on outdoor hard courts. It was the 31st edition of the event known that year as the Next Generation Adelaide International, and was part of the International Series of the 2008 ATP Tour. It took place at the Memorial Drive Park in Adelaide, Australia, from 31 December 2007 through 6 January 2008.

The draw was led by former World No. 1, two-time Adelaide champion and recent Cincinnati semi-finalist Lleyton Hewitt, Moscow runner-up Paul-Henri Mathieu, and Basel finalist Jarkko Nieminen. Also competing were Bucharest winner Gilles Simon, Canada Masters semi-finalist Radek Štěpánek, Jo-Wilfried Tsonga, Juan Martín del Potro and Sébastien Grosjean.

Unseeded Michaël Llodra won the singles  today.

Finals

Singles

 Michaël Llodra defeated  Jarkko Nieminen, 6–3, 6–4
It was Michaël Llodra's 1st title of the year, and his 2nd overall.

Doubles

 Martín García /  Marcelo Melo defeated  Chris Guccione /  Robert Smeets, 6–3, 3–6, [10–7]

External links
Official website
Singles draw
Doubles draw
Qualifying Singles draw

 
Next Generation Adelaide International
2000s in Adelaide
December 2007 sports events in Australia
January 2008 sports events in Australia